Chrysopetalidae is a family of polychaete worms. The body is short or elongated, with few or numerous segments. All segments bear on their dorsal side a fan or a transverse row of paleae. The cephalic lobe has tentacles and eyes and the buccal segment has two or four tentacular cirri on each side. The parapodia are uniramous or biramous, with dorsal cirri upon all segments. The ventral bristles are compound.

Genera 
The following genera are recognised:

Subfamily Calamyzinae Hartmann-Schröder, 1971

 Boudemos Watson, Carvajal, Sergeeva, Pleijel & Rouse, 2016
 Calamyzas Arwidsson, 1932
 Craseoschema Ravara & Aguado in Ravara et al, 2019
 Flascarpia Blake, 1993
 Iheyomytilidicola Miura & Hashimoto, 1996
 Laubierus Blake, 1993
 Micospina Watson, Carvajal, Sergeeva, Pleijel & Rouse, 2016
 Miura Blake, 1993
 Mytilidiphila Miura & Hashimoto, 1993
 Natsushima Miura & Laubier, 1990
 Nautiliniella Miura & Laubier, 1990
 Petrecca Blake, 1990
 Santelma Blake, 1993
 Shinkai Miura & Laubier, 1990
 Spathochaeta Jimi, Moritaki & Kajihara, 2019
 Thyasiridicola Miura & Hashimoto, 1996
 Vesicomyicola Dreyer, Miura & Van Dover, 2004
 Victoriella Kiseleva, 1996

Subfamily Chrysopetalinae Ehlers, 1864

 Chrysopetalum Ehlers, 1864
 Hyalopale Perkins, 1985
 Paleaequor Watson Russell, 1986
 Paleanotus Schmarda, 1861
 Pseudodysponetus Böggemann, 2009
 Strepternos Watson Russell, 1991
 Thrausmatos Watson, 2001
 Treptopale Perkins, 1985

Subfamily Dysponetinae Aguado, Nygren & Rouse, 2013

 Dysponetus Levinsen, 1879

No subfamily:

 Acanthopale San Martín, 1986
 Arichlidon Watson Russell, 1986
 Bhawania Schmarda, 1861

References 

 Darbyshire, T. & Brewin, P.E. 2015. Three new species of Dysponetus Levinsen, 1879 (Polychaeta: Chrysopetalidae) from the South Atlantic and Southern Ocean, with a re-description of Dysponetus bulbosus Hartmann-Schröder, 1982. Zootaxa, 4040 (3), pages 359–370, 
 Watson, C. 2015. Seven new species of Paleanotus (Annelida: Chrysopetalidae) described from Lizard Island, Great Barrier Reef, and coral reefs of northern Australia and the Indo-Pacific: two cryptic species pairs revealed between western Pacific Ocean and the eastern Indian Ocean. IN Hutchings, P.A. & Kupriyanova, E.K. (eds.), 2015: Coral reef-associated fauna of Lizard Island, Great Barrier Reef: polychaetes and allies. Zootaxa, 4019 (1), pages 707–732,

External links 
 
 
 Images of Chrysopetalidae at the Encyclopedia of Life

Phyllodocida
Annelid families